Choksey is a surname. Notable people with the surname include:

Shubhaavi Choksey, Indian television actress
Sudhin Choksey (born 1954), Indian banking executive
 Champaklal Choksey, co-founder of Asian Paints